Priyanga Burford is a British actress, narrator and writer. Her acting credits include roles in No Time to Die, A Long Way Down, A Rather English Marriage, The Thick of It, Silent Witness and Casualty. In 2015 she starred in the Channel 4 mockumentary UKIP: The First 100 Days in which she played the fictional Deepa Kaur, the first Asian woman to be elected as a UK Independence Party Member of Parliament. In 2017, she appeared in the premiere production of Consent at the Royal National Theatre, London.

In 2017, she starred in King Charles III as Mrs Stevens, Leader of the Opposition in a 2017 future history television film adapted by Mike Bartlett from his play of the same name. In it, she convinces the King to not grant royal assent to law regarding the freedom of the press, which in turn causes a constitutional crisis. In 2021, she starred in series 2 of the ITV crime drama Innocent.

References

External links

Living people
British film actresses
British Asian writers
British television actresses
20th-century British writers
British people of Sri Lankan descent
20th-century British actresses
Place of birth missing (living people)
20th-century British women writers
21st-century British actresses
Year of birth missing (living people)